Sergei Nikolaevich Chistyakov (born 3 May 1990) is a Russian retired ice hockey player and the current head coach of SKSO Yekaterinburg in the Zhenskaya Hockey League (ZhHL). A forward, he played with Avtomobilist Yekaterinburg of the Kontinental Hockey League (KHL) during the 2012–13 season.

References

External links
 

1990 births
Living people
Avtomobilist Yekaterinburg players
Kazzinc-Torpedo players
Russian ice hockey coaches
Russian ice hockey forwards
Sportspeople from Yekaterinburg
Sputnik Nizhny Tagil players
Zhenskaya Hockey League coaches